Lawrence County Airpark  is a public use airport located two nautical miles (3.7 km) west of the central business district of Chesapeake, a village in Lawrence County, Ohio, United States. It is publicly owned by Lawrence County Board of Commissioners. The airport lies across the Ohio River from Huntington, West Virginia.

History 
Lawrence County Airpark, originally known as Huntington Airport, was established in 1929.  In June of that year, John Paul Riddle of the Cincinnati-based Embry-Riddle Company completed negotiations for the establishment of an airport for the cities of the Kentucky, Ohio, West Virginia tri-state area. The company sought to expand their growing air mail and passenger routes east, via the Ohio River valley.  The Embry-Riddle Company put up $100,000 dollars, with another $25,000 contributed by the Huntington Chamber of Commerce, $25,000 from the Huntington Bridge Company, and $25,000 from a local aviation booster club.  The club enrolled 250 members, charging a membership fee of $100.  This money was used to fund the airport project.  The land was purchased primarily from a Mr. Joe L. Wilson, partner in the Huntington Bridge Company, who had used the land for farmland.

Development of the land began in June, but was slowed due to high levels of rain. Eventually several houses and a barn were removed, though two structures were initially left intact on the north side of the field for use as office and flight crew facilities. The opening fell on Labor Day weekend, and massive celebrations were planned. Approximately 45,000 people attended the opening events throughout the weekend, which included aerial stunts and rides ($10 each). Ten planes, owned by the Embry-Riddle Company were stationed at the field. These included several Wacos. A Ford Tri-Motor was on display for opening day. There was a raffle for a free flight to Cincinnati's Lunken Field, and a folded-wing aircraft carrying local government and civic leaders Taxied across the bridge, led a parade around Huntington, West Virginia, then returned to the airport, extended its wings, and took them on an aerial tour.

At the time of opening, the Embry-Riddle Company was to run the field and FBO.  The company also opened a flight school.  Embry-Riddle closed its flight school and withdrew service the next year, the result of disputes with the Huntington Chamber of Commerce over the building of a hangar facility.

The 1930s were marked by repeated attempts to establish passenger and mail service to the H-I-C Airport.  1932 and 1936 saw relatively short attempts by American Airlines to set up service.  In 1938, a permanent, regular service was begun.  This was in part due to an agreement to lengthen and pave the main runway.  As part of this deal, land was purchased for a 1,000-foot runway extension to the west in 1937.  Air service lasted until April, 1945, when American closed their weather office and stopped mail and passenger services.  The airline had been stopping an H-I-C when weight conditions allowed - by 1945 the runway was too short for AA's DC-3s to take off fully loaded.  The runway had deteriorated markedly by 1945, and the main runway still had not been extended.  This ultimately resulted in the 1947 creation of a Huntington Airport Authority to establish the current Tri-State Airport (HTS) in Wayne County, West Virginia.

Facilities and aircraft 
It has one runway designated 8/26 with an asphalt surface measuring 3,001 by 70 feet (915 x 21 m).

There is one FBO on-field, Attitude Aviation.  They currently have 3 C-172 Skyhawks and one Beechcraft Bonanza available for rent, as well as maintenance and repair facilities, 100LL fuel, oil, and assorted charts and supplies for sale in addition to flight instruction.  There is also a jump zone, Tri-State Skydivers.  They operate a modified C-182, have instructors and parachutes available for rent, and operate most weekends throughout the year.

For the 12-month period ending June 12, 2007, the airport had 41,910 aircraft operations, an average of 114 per day: 98% general aviation and 1% air taxi, and <1% military. At that time there were 34 aircraft based at this airport: 88% single-engine, 6% multi-engine and 6% ultralight.

References

External links 
 Attitude Aviation, the airport's fixed-base operator
 Aerial photo as of 29 April 1995 from USGS The National Map
 

Airports in Ohio
Transportation in Lawrence County, Ohio
Buildings and structures in Lawrence County, Ohio